Eugene Austin Brown (November 13, 1935 – March 22, 2020) was an American basketball player.  He was an All-American at the University of San Francisco and was a significant player on their undefeated 1956 NCAA championship team.

Brown, a 6'3" guard from George Washington High School in San Francisco, played college basketball for coach Phil Woolpert at the University of San Francisco.  Brown was a key reserve for the Dons' 1955–56 team, which went undefeated and won their second straight NCAA championship.  Coming off the bench for most of the season, Brown was inserted into the starting lineup in the 1956 NCAA tournament after star guard K. C. Jones was declared ineligible.  Brown made the most of his opportunity, scoring 16 points in the NCAA championship game against Iowa.

Brown started his last two years as the Dons returned to the 1957 Final Four, despite losing national player of the year Bill Russell.  Brown led the team in scoring, averaging 15.1 points per game.  He again led the team in scoring as a senior (14.2 per game) and was named a third team All-American by the National Association of Basketball Coaches and an honorable mention All-American by the Associated Press.

After his basketball career ended, Brown went into careers working with young people in sports and law enforcement.  He was San Francisco's first African-American sheriff.

Brown died on March 22, 2020.

References

1935 births
2020 deaths
All-American college men's basketball players
American men's basketball players
Basketball players from San Francisco
Boston Celtics draft picks
California sheriffs
Guards (basketball)
San Francisco Dons men's basketball players
San Francisco Saints players